Police Football Club may refer to:

  Al-Shorta SC (Iraq)
  Al-Shorta SC (Syria)
  Home United FC
  Sri Lanka Police Sports Club (football)